Malvern Central Shopping Centre is a luxury regional shopping centre located in the Eastern Melbourne suburb of Malvern, in Victoria, Australia. The centre, which opened in 1987 includes a food court, two anchor tenants and numerous specialty stores.

History 
Malvern Central opened on the 27th of July 1987 as a 14,000 square metre Grollo built complex. The complex consisted of Target and Safeway stores, as well as 46 speciality shops.
It was renovated and redeveloped in 2013.

Tenants and amenities 
Malvern Central comprises about 50 stores with two anchor tenants. Stores include Woolworths, David Jones, BWS, Adairs, Bakers Delight, Boost, Decjuba, Laser Clinics Australia, Peter Bouchier, Roll'd, Seed, Telstra, and Athlete's Foot.

Location 
Malvern Central is located near Malvern Railway Station. Services from this station include the Crabourne, Pakenham, and Frankston lines. The Route 5 tram service operates in front of the centre on Wattletree Road, and Route 16 operates on nearby Glenferrie Road.

In June 2022, Evie installed 2 electric vehicle charging spaces in the basement carpark of Malvern Central.

References 

Shopping centres in Melbourne
Shopping malls established in 1987
1987 establishments in Australia